Get Out of My Head may refer to:

Entertainment
"Get Out of My Head!", a 2001 episode of The Grim Adventures of Billy & Mandy

Songs
"Get Out of My Head", by Combichrist from their 2009 album Today We Are All Demons
"Get Out of My Head", by Cypress Hill from their 2000 album Skull & Bones
"Get Out of My Head", by Firewater from their 2001 album Psychopharmacology
"Get Out of My Head", by Four Year Strong from their 2020 album Brain Pain
"Get Out of My Head", by Heavens to Betsy
"Get Out of My Head", by Lil Wayne from his 2020 album Funeral
"Get Out of My Head", by MDFMK from their 2000 album MDFMK
"Get Out of My Head", by Status Quo from their 2019 album Backbone
"Get Out of My Head", by Bonnie Tyler from her 1981 album Goodbye to the Island

See also
Get Out My Head (disambiguation)